Sama Sahr Mondeh is a Sierra Leonean politician and agriculturalist. Mondeh has been the Minister of Agriculture and Food Security under President Ahmed Tejan Kabbah since 2002.

Sources
 List of government minister of Sierra Leone on cia.gov 

Year of birth missing (living people)
Living people
Agriculturalists
Government ministers of Sierra Leone
Place of birth missing (living people)
21st-century Sierra Leonean politicians